"Pose" is the first single by Puerto Rico reggaeton artist Daddy Yankee from the movie soundtrack to the motion picture Talento de Barrio, and was released on May 14, 2008, by Machete Music and El Cartel Records. The single was made available through online music stores on August 12, 2008. The song features different musical styles, ones that differ from Daddy Yankee's past singles. It is an electro song, which fuses other genres such as latin pop, dance-pop, pop rap, dance, hip hop and pop, as well as Latin and dance rhythms.

Background

Music video
The music video for "Pose" was directed by Christian G Fortes [InstaGram @C_holiday40 ]. It was released by Universal Music Group on June 26, 2008. Dance groups JabbaWockeeZ and Shhh! from America's Best Dance Crew make cameo appearances as well.

Chart performance
"Pose" is the album's most successful single, peaking at number 4 on the Billboard Hot Latin Songs chart, as well as topping the Billboard Hot Latin Rhythm Airplay chart at number 1. The single is Ayala's 5th Top 5 single on the Billboard Hot Latin Songs chart, and his second consecutive Top 5 single after Ella Me Levantó. The song also peaked at number 7 on the Billboard Latin Tropical Airplay chart.

Charts

Accolades

American Society of Composers, Authors, and Publishers Awards

|-
|rowspan="1" scope="row"|2009
|Pose
|Urban Song of the Year
|
|-

References

Spanish-language songs
Daddy Yankee songs
2008 singles
Record Report Top Latino number-one singles
Songs written by Daddy Yankee
2008 songs